The Colorists were a group of sixteenth-century German organ composers that heavily ornamented their compositions following Italian coloraturas and other figures. Among others, the colorists include Sebastian Virdung, Arnolt Schlick, Elias Nikolaus Ammerbach, Paul Hofhaimer, Bernhard Schmid the Elder, Bernhard Schmid the Younger, Jacob Paix, Conrad Paumann, and Johann Woltz. The term was originally a derogatory designation applied by August Gottfried Ritter (1811–1885), and they were accused of having "overindulge[d] in the use of splashy and meaningless coloratura passages."

References

Further reading
Apel, Willi. The History of Keyboard Music to 1700.  Bloomington, IN: Indiana University Press, 1972, pp. 246ff.

German classical composers
German music
Organs (music)
Renaissance music
16th-century classical composers